The Mark Bostick Golf Course at the University of Florida, located in Gainesville, Florida, is the home course of the Florida Gators men's golf and Florida Gators women's golf teams. The course is owned by the university and operated by the University Athletic Association (UAA).

It is heavily lined with trees, and includes over 140 bunkers. The facilities include the Guy Bostick Club House, and a dedicated practice area for the Gators men's and women's golf teams. The course is named for Mark Bostick, president of Comcar Industries and a generous donor to the Florida Gators athletics program.

The course was formerly the home of the Gainesville Country Club, and was acquired by the university in 1963. Noted Scottish golfer and golf course architect Donald Ross designed the course in 1921, when it was originally owned and operated by the country club. In 2001, golf course architect Bobby Weed renovated the facility, with $4 million in private donations. As part of the renovation, the course length was stretched by 500 yards, to a total length just over 6,700 yards, and re-rated as a par 70. MacCurrach Golf Construction, Inc. was the primary construction contractor. When completed in November 2001, the University Athletic Association celebrated the occasion with "Gator Golf Day," an alumni golf event that included former Gator golf greats.

The Mark Bostick Golf Course hosts the annual Gator Invitational and Lady Gator Invitational tournaments, as well as the annual Gator Golf Day alumni event. The course has also served as the site for the NCAA Regional tournament on several occasions, including 2009. The club house has served a faculty club meeting place, and a venue for student organization events.

University of Florida students, faculty, staff and alumni may play the course. Tee times may be scheduled in advance, Friday through Sunday.

Scorecard 

The par and yardage shown are from the orange tees, which may be played only with permission from the course management. Players can play from the shorter blue, white or red (ladies) tees without course permission.

Cross country
The Mark Bostick Golf Course is the home course for the Florida Gators men's and women's cross country teams.

Images

See also 

 Emily Glaser
 Florida Gators
 Golf
 Golf course
 List of University of Florida buildings
 University Athletic Association

References

External links 

 GatorSports.com – Gators sports page of the Gainesville Sun.
 Gatorzone.com – Official website of the Florida Gators.
Mark Bostick Golf Course at the University of Florida – Official website of the Mark Bostick Golf Course.
 University Athletic Association – Official website of the University Athletic Association.
 University of Florida – Official website of the University of Florida.

Buildings at the University of Florida
College golf clubs and courses in the United States
College cross country courses in the United States
Cross country running courses in Florida
Florida Gators golf clubs and courses
Florida Gators cross country
Golf clubs and courses designed by Bobby Weed
Golf clubs and courses in Florida
1921 establishments in Florida